The 1996 Houston Oilers season was the 37th season overall and 27th with the National Football League (NFL) and their final season in Houston. The team bested their previous season's output of 7–9, but failed to qualify for the playoffs for the third consecutive season. The Oilers only won two out of their eight games at home. However, on the road they won six out of eight games as the Oilers finished with an 8-8 record. Houston running back Eddie George won the Offensive Rookie of the Year with 1,368 yards rushing. Despite finishing 8–8 record, the Oilers failed to sell out any of its home games at the Houston Astrodome for the second consecutive season.

The Oilers had already established itself as a lame duck franchise; the league had approved the team's relocation to Nashville, Tennessee a year ahead of schedule, although it was not originally scheduled to take place until 1998. With the team having given up on Houston, the city responded in kind: fan support and attendance dropped to negligible levels for the 1996 season, the team's radio network was all but disbanded, and the local broadcasts were being cut off in favor of preseason NBA basketball. The Oilers, unwilling to continue in Houston after such a debacle, quickly moved to Memphis, Tennessee's Liberty Bowl Memorial Stadium in 1997, becoming the Tennessee Oilers (Memphis, too, would reject the "temporary" housing of the Oilers, forcing the team to move to Vanderbilt Stadium in Nashville until the new Nashville stadium was finished in 1999).

Offseason

NFL Draft

Personnel

Staff

Roster

Regular season

Schedule

Standings

Game summaries

Week 1: vs. Kansas City Chiefs

Week 2: at Jacksonville Jaguars

Week 3: vs. Baltimore Ravens

Week 5: at Pittsburgh Steelers

Week 6: at Cincinnati Bengals

Week 7: at Atlanta Falcons

Week 8: vs. Pittsburgh Steelers

This would be the second-highest attended game of the season at the Astrodome, with a recorded of attendance of 50,337; however, many of these fans were Steelers' fans. Despite their home stadium being invaded by fans of the opposing team, the Oilers would win the game 23–13. This would be the last game the Oilers would win at the Astrodome.

Week 9: vs. San Francisco 49ers

With a recorded attendance of 53,664, this would be the highest attended game of the season at the Astrodome. Like the previous game, many of the fans in attendance were rooting for the opposing team. The Oilers led for most of the game, but Jeff Brohm would lead the 49ers on what would be the game-winning drive with a 20-yard touchdown pass to rookie wide receiver Terrell Owens early in the fourth quarter. The Oilers would have two more chances to take the lead back, but turned the ball over on downs on one drive and quarterback Steve McNair (who had replaced an ineffective Chris Chandler) threw an interception on the Oilers' final drive.

Week 10: at Seattle Seahawks

Week 11: at New Orleans Saints

Week 12: vs. Miami Dolphins

Week 13: vs. Carolina Panthers

Week 14: at New York Jets

Week 15: vs. Jacksonville Jaguars

Week 16: vs. Cincinnati Bengals

The Oilers would keep the Bengals scoreless in the first half, but were outscored 21–7 in the second half. This was the last game the Oilers would play in Houston. With the loss, the Oilers dropped to 7–8 and finished with a home record of 2–6.

During the 1995 season, owner Bud Adams announced that the team would be relocating to Tennessee. As a result, fan attendance had been abysmal for the 1996 season, with this game reaching a new low with a recorded attendance of only 15,131. The team's move to Tennessee was not scheduled to take place until 1998, but after a season of fan apathy that resulted in attendance woes, the NFL allowed Adams to move the team a year ahead of schedule. The Oilers would have stadium issues for the next two seasons, playing each season in a different temporary home. The team would play the next season at Liberty Bowl Memorial Stadium in Memphis, Tennessee before moving to Vanderbilt Stadium in Nashville, Tennessee for 1998. The team would find a new permanent home stadium in 1999 at the Adelphia Coliseum in Nashville, with the team being renamed to the Tennessee Titans.

An NFL game would not be played in Houston again until September 8, 2002, with Houston's new NFL franchise, the Houston Texans, defeating the Dallas Cowboys 19–10. The Oilers, then known as the Tennessee Titans, would return to Houston later that year on December 29 to play the Texans. Tennessee would win the game 13–3.

Week 17: at Baltimore Ravens

The Oilers traveled to Baltimore to take on the Ravens in the season finale. The Ravens' comeback attempt fell short, with the Oilers winning the game 24–21, finishing the franchise's last season as the Houston Oilers with an 8–8 record.

References

External links
 1996 Houston Oilers at Pro-Football-Reference.com

Houston Oilers seasons
Houston Oilers
Houston
1996 in Houston